Turkmene finitimus is an extinct lamprid from the Danata Formation Lagerstatten, of the Upper Paleocene of Turkmenistan.  It lived sympatrically with its close relative, Danatinia.

In life, T. finitimus would have resembled a spadefish with beak-like lips, or a very small opah (its closest living relative) with a bulging forehead.

External links
 Turkmene at the Paleobiology Database
 The first fossil ribbonfish (Teleostei, Lampridiformes, Trachipteridae) by Giorgio Carnevale, Istituto di Geoscienze e Georisorse, Pisa, Italy.

Turkmenidae
Paleocene genus extinctions